Richard Virgil Grace (October 1, 1898 – June 25, 1965), known as Dick Grace, was an American stunt pilot who specialized in crashing planes for films. Films that he appeared in include Sky Bride, The Lost Squadron, Lilac Time, and the first Best Picture Oscar winner Wings.

He served in both world wars, bombing Germany, as a B-17 Flying Fortress co-pilot with the 486th Bombardment Group. After the Second World War, he operated a charter business in South America. He was married to Crystine Francis Malstrom, a stage actress who appeared in Abie's Irish Rose. He was the author of several books, including Squadron of Death, Crash Pilot, I Am Still Alive, and Visibility Unlimited. 

Grace sustained a serious neck injury when he fell out of the cockpit during the filming of Wings.  But he made a full recovery and was one of the few stunt pilots of his day who died of natural causes.

Stunt work on films
The Flying Fool (1925)
Wings (1927)
Lilac Time (1928)
Young Eagles (1930)
The Lost Squadron (1932)
 Devil's Squadron (1936)

References

External links

Article by Dick Grace from Modern Mechanics Magazine 

1898 births
1965 deaths
United States Army Air Service pilots of World War I
American stunt performers
Stunt pilots
United States Army Air Forces officers
United States Army Air Forces pilots of World War II